Alberto García Castillo (born 22 July 1957) is a Mexican former swimmer who competed in the 1972 Summer Olympics.

References

1957 births
Living people
Mexican male swimmers
Mexican male freestyle swimmers
Olympic swimmers of Mexico
Swimmers at the 1972 Summer Olympics
Central American and Caribbean Games gold medalists for Mexico
Competitors at the 1974 Central American and Caribbean Games
Central American and Caribbean Games medalists in swimming
20th-century Mexican people